Lucky Numbers is a 1998 compilation album by Frank Sinatra.

Track listing
 "Theme from New York, New York" (Fred Ebb, John Kander) - 3:26
 "The Boys' Night Out" (Sammy Cahn, Jimmy Van Heusen) - 2:48
 "Come Blow Your Horn" (Cahn, Van Heusen) - 3:08
 "Pocketful of Miracles" (Cahn, Van Heusen) - 2:39
 "Luck Be a Lady" (Frank Loesser) - 5:17
 "That's Life" (Dean Kay Thompson, Kelly Gordon) - 3:10
 "Pick Yourself Up" (Jerome Kern, Dorothy Fields) - 2:33
 "Pennies from Heaven" (Arthur Johnston, Johnny Burke) - 3:29
 "Here's to the Losers" (Jack Segal, Robert Wells) - 3:04
 "Winners" (Joe Raposo) - 2:53

Personnel
 Frank Sinatra - vocals
 Nelson Riddle - arranger, conductor
 Don Costa
 Billy May
 Neal Hefti
 Ernie Freeman
 Gordon Jenkins

References

1998 compilation albums
Frank Sinatra compilation albums
Compilation albums published posthumously